Ra Ra Riot is an American indie rock band consisting of vocalist Wes Miles, bassist Mathieu Santos, guitarist Milo Bonacci, violinist Rebecca Zeller and drummer Kenny Bernard.

History
Ra Ra Riot formed in January 2006, playing at houses and venues around the Syracuse University campus. They recorded a demo in February 2006. The band started to attract attention due to their energetic live shows, enough to gain an appearance at the CMJ Music Marathon, fewer than six months after their formation. Following this appearance, their live show received the first of several favorable reviews from Spin, who called them "one of the best young bands we've heard in a really long time". They went on to open for Art Brut and Bow Wow Wow in New York City, toured the UK twice on their own, then returned, opening for the Editors (footage of which can be found on Crackle); they also toured North America supporting Tokyo Police Club. Their first solo headlining tour of the U.S. was completed in 2007, and in early 2008, they embarked on a second. The band was also invited to play the Iceland Airwaves Festival in Reykjavík, Iceland. They recorded three sessions on the national online radio station WOXY and three for the acclaimed Daytrotter sessions at Futureappletree Studio 1 in Rock Island, Illinois.

In 2007, they made their first appearance at South by Southwest and headlined a show at the Seaport Music Festival in New York City. The band returned to appear again at the South by Southwest Music Conference in March 2008.

On June 2, 2007, at 3 a.m., the band's original drummer, John Ryan Pike of Hamilton, Massachusetts, went missing under suspicious circumstances at a party at Wilbur's Point in Fairhaven, Massachusetts after a show in Providence, Rhode Island. A search party discovered his cellphone on the beach at Buzzards Bay. His body was discovered June 3, 2007 at 4:10 p.m. in Buzzards Bay; Pike was believed to have drowned. No foul play was suspected. Ra Ra Riot issued a statement a few weeks after Pike's funeral that they would continue as a band.

In July 2007, an eponymous six-song EP was released on the Rebel Group label. In the winter of 2007, the band signed to major label V2 Records. To celebrate their new label deal, Ra Ra Riot released "Dying Is Fine" and "Each Year (RAC Mix)" on 7" vinyl as an A/B single. In December 2007, the band announced that they had finished recording songs for their debut studio album.  

On May 19, 2008, the band announced that they had signed to Barsuk Records. They released their debut album, The Rhumb Line, on August 19, 2008 in North America, and on September 22, 2008 in Europe via V2/Cooperative Music. The music video for "Can You Tell" won Best Music Video at the 2009 Finger Lakes Film Festival on November 7, 2009.

In the spring of 2009, Barsuk released the Can You Tell EP, featuring remixes, early demos and live recordings. The band released their second studio album, The Orchard, on August 24, 2010. It was produced by Ra Ra Riot and Andrew Maury. Nine of the 10 tracks were mixed by Death Cab for Cutie's Chris Walla, while one was mixed by Vampire Weekend's Rostam Batmanglij.

In January 2011, Ra Ra Riot were nominated for the 10th annual Independent Music Awards in the Pop/Rock Album category for The Orchard. Also in 2011, their song "Boy" was featured in a Honda Civic commercial and used in an episode ("A History of Violins") of the TV show Royal Pains as well as in an episode of Shameless. On February 10, 2012, cellist Alexandra Lawn announced that she was leaving the band.

The band's third studio album, Beta Love, was released on January 22, 2013, coinciding with a live worldwide Internet broadcast of the band's concert that night at Music Hall of Williamsburg in Brooklyn, New York. The album was the band's first full-length since the departure of Lawn and marked a shift in their musical style away from their earlier baroque pop and more towards synthpop. A video was produced for the song "Dance With Me".

On February 19, 2016, Ra Ra Riot released their fourth studio album, Need Your Light. The album was produced by Ryan Hadlock (Lumineers, Vance Joy) with additional production by Batmanglij, who produced and co-wrote the title track as well as the popular single "Water."

On May 17th, 2019, the band shared a new song, “Flowers”, along with the announcement of their fifth studio album, Superbloom. The album, released on August 9th, saw the band collaborate with Rostam once again.

Members

Current members

 Wes Miles – lead vocals, keyboards, occasional acoustic guitar (2006–present)
 Mathieu Santos – bass guitar, backing vocals (2006–present)
 Milo Bonacci – guitar, keyboards (2006–present)
 Rebecca Zeller – violin, backing vocals (2006–present)
 Kenny Bernard – drums, programming (2011–present)

Former members

 Shaw Flick – lead vocals (2006)
 John Pike – drums (2006–2007; died 2007)
 Alexandra Lawn – cello (2006–2012)
 Michael Ashley – drums (2007)
 Cameron Wisch – drums (2007–2009)
 Gabriel Duquette – drums (2009–2011)

Discography

Studio albums

EPs
Ra Ra Riot EP (2007, Rebel Group)
Can You Tell EP (2009, Barsuk)

Singles

Notes

References

External links
 
 

Indie rock musical groups from New York (state)
Musical groups established in 2006
Musical groups from Syracuse, New York
Barsuk Records artists
V2 Records artists